The Copper Mountain Fire Lookout was built in 1934 in what was then the Glacier Ranger district of Mount Baker National Forest. The cabin-like wood frame lookout is a frame cabin with large windows on each side protected by an awning-style shutter. A shingled gable roof with prominent lightning rods covers the cabin. The lookout measures  by  square. During the winter of 1943 the lookout was manned by the Aircraft Warning Service, watching for enemy aircraft. It is one of three lookouts remaining in North Cascades National Park from the Forest Service administration.

The Copper Mountain  Fire Lookout was placed on the National Register of Historic Places on February 10, 1989.

References

Buildings and structures completed in 1934
Buildings and structures in Whatcom County, Washington
Aircraft Warning Service
Fire lookout towers on the National Register of Historic Places in Washington (state)
National Register of Historic Places in North Cascades National Park
National Register of Historic Places in Whatcom County, Washington
1934 establishments in Washington (state)